The Agrupación XXIII de Marzo was upgraded to Division status as the Division XXIII Marzo prior to the Battle of Santander.  It was one of the Italian Blackshirts units sent to Spain during the Spanish Civil War to make up the "Corpo Truppe Volontarie" (Corps of Volunteer Troops), or CTV.  
Was strengthened after the end of the War in the North for the Aragon Offensive in 1938 with 2nd CCNN Division "Fiamme Nere" and renamed XXIII Marzo Division "Fiamme Nere" (Black Flames in Italian).

Order of battle

Battle of Santander, August 1937
Division XXIII di Marzo
 4th Infantry Regiment
 Battalion Bufalo 
 Battalion Vampa 
 Battalion Toro 
 5th Battery 65/17 
 4th Mortar platoon
 5th Infantry Regiment
 540th Battalion Lupi  
 Battalion Ardente 
 Battalion Inesorabile 
 6th Battery 65/17 
 5th Mortar platoon
 Division Artillery  
 Grupo de 65/17 (motorized)
 Mixed Engineer Company 
 Logistics Section 
 Carabinieri Section 
 Mixed Motor Transport Company

Aragon offensive, 1938
 Commander:  Luigi Frusci
 IV Grupo de banderas 
 Battalion Bufalo 
 Battalion Vampa 
 Battalion Toro 
 Battery of 65/17 
 V Grupo de banderas 
 Battalion Inessorabile 
 Battalion Ardente 
 Battalion Lupi 
 Battery of 65/17 
 VII Grupo de banderas 
 Battalion Implacabile 
 Battalion Inflessibile 
 Battalion Disperata 
 Battery of 65/17
 Division Artillery 
 IIº Grupo de 75/27 
 Grupo de 75/27 
 Grupo de 100/17 
 Grupo de 20mm AA 
 Grupo de 37mm CC
 Engineer Company
 Logistics Section 
 Carabinieri Section 
 Sanitation Section 
 Truck Company

Sources
de Mesa, José Luis, El regreso de las legiones: (la ayuda militar italiana a la España nacional, 1936-1939),  García Hispán, Granada:España, 1994

See also
1st Blackshirt Division (23 March)

Divisions of Italy in the Spanish Civil War
Military units and formations established in 1937
Blackshirt divisions of Italy